Robert J. Peroni is an American lawyer, currently the Fondren Foundation Centennial Chair for Faculty Excellence, previously the Parker C. Fielder Regents Professor and James A. Elkins Centennial Chair at University of Texas School of Law. He was also previously the J. Landis Martin Visiting Professor and Jack N. Pritzker Distinguished Visiting Professor at Northwestern University.

References

Year of birth missing (living people)
Living people
University of Texas at Austin faculty
American lawyers
Northwestern University faculty
Northwestern University alumni
New York University alumni
DePaul University alumni